The 2006 congressional elections in Tennessee was held on November 7, 2006, to determine who will represent the state of Tennessee in the United States House of Representatives.

Following the 2006 elections, no seats changed hands, leaving the Tennessee delegation at a 5-4 Democratic majority.

Overview

District 1

Incumbent Republican Congressman Bill Jenkins, approaching his seventieth birthday, declined to seek a sixth term in order to spend more time with his family, creating an open seat. This staunchly conservative district, based in northeastern Tennessee, has been held by Republicans since 1881, one of the longest streaks out of any district nationwide. Republican State Representative David Davis won a narrow victory in the Republican primary and moved on to the general election, where he defeated Democratic candidate Rick Trent, a real estate businessman, and several independent candidates by a solid, but smaller margin than is normally seen in this district.

District 2

Incumbent Republican Congressman Jimmy Duncan, seeking a tenth term, faced no serious competition from two-time congressional candidate John Greene. This congressional district, based largely in the Knoxville Metropolitan Area, has been continuously held by the Republican Party since 1867 and has a long history of staunch conservatism. Duncan defeated Greene in an overwhelming landslide, as expected, winning another term in Congress.

District 3

This gerrymandered district, which stretches from the Chattanooga metropolitan area in southern Tennessee to Claiborne County in northern Tennessee, is strongly conservative and has been represented by Republican Congressman Zach Wamp since his initial 1994 election. Seeking a seventh term, Wamp easily dispatched Democratic nominee Brent Benedict to win re-election.

District 4

Incumbent Democratic Congressman Lincoln Davis has represented this district since his 2002 election, claiming the seat that Van Hilleary vacated to run for Governor of Tennessee. Though this district has become more conservative in recent years, it has a long history of electing Democratic Congressmen, including Jim Cooper, Al Gore, and Albert Gore, Sr. It stretches from the outer reaches of the Nashville metropolitan area, hugs much of the southern Tennessee border, and shoots upwards to Campbell County in northern Tennessee. Davis ultimately defeated Republican candidate Kenneth Martin in a landslide win to seize a third term in Congress.

District 5

This Democratic-leaning district, largely based in the city of Nashville, has been represented by Democratic Congressman Jim Cooper since 2002, though he had previously represented an adjacent district from 1983 to 1995. True to the district's liberal tilt, Cooper swamped Republican nominee Thomas Kovach and independent candidate Ginny Welsch to win a third term in Congress.

District 6

Incumbent Democratic Congressman Bart Gordon, a high-ranking member on the House Science and Technology Committee, sought a twelfth term in this increasingly conservative district based in the eastern suburbs of Nashville. In a testament to Gordon's moderate tenure, his widespread popularity, and the Democratic wave sweeping the country in 2006, Gordon was re-elected again with nearly seventy percent of the vote.

District 7

This staunchly conservative district, which stretches from the western suburbs of Memphis, runs along the southern border of Tennessee, and hugs the western suburbs of Nashville, is the state's wealthiest. Incumbent Republican Congresswoman Marsha Blackburn has represented this district since her election in 2002, replacing Republican Congressman Ed Bryant, who opted to run for Senate. Blackburn was victorious in her bid for a third term, defeating Democratic nominee Bill Morrison and five independents in a landslide.

District 8

This Republican-leaning district, rooted in the northwestern portion of the state, has been represented by moderate Democratic Congressman John S. Tanner since 1989, and, though it has grown more conservative over the years, has remained loyal to Tanner. Yet again, Tanner, who was seeking his ninth term in Congress, overwhelmed Republican nominee John Farmer to emerge victorious.

District 9

Campaign
This district, based exclusively within the city of Memphis, has the distinction of being the state's most liberal district, the only district contained within one county, and Tennessee's only African-American majority district. Incumbent Democratic Congressman Harold Ford, Jr. opted to run for Senate rather than seeking a sixth term, creating an open seat. Democratic State Senator Steve Cohen won the Democratic primary to replace Ford with a slight plurality, which is tantamount to election in this district. Cohen faced Republican nominee Mark White and Jake Ford, the younger brother of Harold Ford, Jr. Cohen defeated both opponents by a solid margin, and held the distinction of being white and representing a solidly African-American district, a rarity.

Endorsements

Results

References

See also

Tennessee
2006
2006 Tennessee elections